Most (classical) composers had one or a few lyricists with whom they preferred to work:

Bach: Picander
Mozart: Da Ponte, Schikaneder
Sullivan: Gilbert
Giuseppe Verdi: Arrigo Boito in his later works
Isaac Albéniz: Francis Burdett Money-Coutts
Richard Strauss: Hugo von Hofmannsthal
Puccini: Luigi Illica and Giuseppe Giacosa
Satie: Contamine, Plato (when composing Socrate: Platon s'avère comme un collaborateur parfait, très doux, jamais importun - "Plato shows himself a perfect coworker, very soft, never out of line")
Amadeo Vives: Federico Romero and Guillermo Fernández Shaw
Rodgers: Hammerstein
Gershwin: Ira Gershwin
Andrew Lloyd Webber: Tim Rice, followed by Don Black
Bertold Hummel: Hermann Hesse
Handel: Charles Jennens

Composers that preferred to write their own libretti
Richard Wagner
Arrigo Boito
Modest Mussorgsky
Leoš Janáček
Olivier Messiaen
Cole Porter
Gian Carlo Menotti
Irving Berlin
Stephen Sondheim
Michael Tippett

Lyricists
Composers
Composers